Offences Against the Person Act (with its variations) is a stock short title used for legislation in the United Kingdom, in the Republic of Ireland, in Hong Kong, in New Zealand, in Tasmania, in Jamaica, and in Antigua and Barbuda, relating to offences against the person. It seems to have been derived from the long title of the Act which has come to be known as the Offences Against the Person Act 1828. It is sometimes abbreviated to OAPA, as in "OAPA 1861".

The Bill for an Act with this short title will have been known as a Offences Against the Person Bill during its passage through Parliament.

"Offences Against the Person Acts" may be a generic name either for legislation bearing that short title or for all legislation which relates to offences against the person. It is not a term of art.

List

Antigua and Barbuda

Colony of Antigua and Barbuda
The Offences Against the Person (Amendment) Act, 1982

Jamaica

Colony of Jamaica 
The Offences Against the Person Act, 1864

Hong Kong

British Hong Kong
The Offences against the Person Ordinance 1865 (No. 2)
The Offences against the Person (Amendment) Ordinance 1913
The Offences against the Person (Amendment) Ordinance 1982, CAP 212

The Offences against the Person Ordinances 1865 and 1913 is the collective title of the Offences against the Person Ordinance 1865 and the Offences against the Person (Amendment) Ordinance 1913.

New Zealand

Colony of New Zealand
The Offences against the Person Act 1866 (30 Vict No 19)
The Offences against the Person Act 1867 (31 Vict 1867 No 5)
The Offences against the Person Act Amendment Act 1868 (32 Vict No 20)
The Offences against the Person Act Amendment Act 1868 (38 Vict 1874 No 4) which repealed and replaced the provisions of the Offences against the Person Act Amendment Act 1868 (32 Vict No 20).
The Offences against the Person Act 1889 (53 Vict 1889 No 17)
The third schedule of the Criminal Code Act 1893 (57 Vict 1893 No 56) repealed and replaced the provisions in these acts as well as the English parliament's Offences against the Person Act 1866 (14 and 15 Vict.,c.100), along with other English and New Zealand legislation.

Republic of Ireland

Republic of Ireland
The Non-Fatal Offences against the Person Act 1997

Tasmania

Colony of Tasmania
The Offences against the Person Act 1885
The Offences against the Person Act 1899

United Kingdom

United Kingdom of Great Britain and Ireland
The Offences Against the Person Act 1828
The Offences Against the Person (Ireland) Act 1829
The Offences Against the Person Act 1837
The Offences against the Person Act 1861
The Offences against the Person Act 1875

See also
List of short titles

References

Offences against the person